Hagop Oshagan (December 9, 1883 in Soloz, Bursa – February 17, 1948 in Aleppo), was an Armenian writer, playwright, and novelist. Among his many novels are the trilogy To One Hundred and One Years (Հարիւր մէկ տարուան), The Harlot (Ծակ պտուկը), and his best-known work, Remnants (Մնացորդաց, 3 vols., 1932-1934), parts of which have been translated into English by G.M.Goshgarian.

Biography
Oshagan was born in 1883 as Hagop Kufejian in Soloz, a village near Bursa. Oshagan was spared the fate of many of his fellow writers and was able to elude the Turkish secret police until early 1918, when he fled from Constantinople to Bulgaria, disguised as a German officer. After the armistice, he returned to Constantinople in 1919, where he adopted his literary surname, and taught literature, actively participating in the literary activities of the Armenian community. At the end of 1922, as many other Armenian intellectuals, he left Constantinople permanently after the arrival of the Kemalist forces. He lived for a brief time in Plovdiv, Bulgaria, and then worked as an instructor of Armenian literature in Egypt (1924-1928), Cyprus (1928-1935), and Palestine (1935-1948), where he forged a reputation as a charismatic educator and prolific writer of fiction, drama, and literary criticism. He died while on a visit to Aleppo, on the eve of a planned visit to Deir ez-Zor, where hundreds of thousands of Armenians had perished during the Armenian genocide.

The genocide of the Armenians defined Oshagan's larger project — the literary reconstruction of the lost ancestral homeland. He wrote his major works in exile. He devoted his knowledge of Armenian literature, his intimate experience of village life and of Turkish-Armenian relations to this project.

His output as a literary critic and historian is grounded in the monumental Panorama of Armenian Literature (Համապատկեր արեւմտահայ գրականութեան, 10 vols., 1945-1982), which has been used as a textbook in Armenian high schools. He is also the author of shorter, book-length volumes of literary studies.

His son Vahé Oshagan (1921-2000) followed in his father's footsteps.  A poet, short story author, novelist, essayist, and literary scholar, he was one of the most important writers and public intellectuals of the Armenian diaspora.

Select bibliography
 Խոնարհները [The Humble Ones], Constantinople, 1920.
 Խորհուրդներու մեհեանը [The Altar of the Symbols], Constantinople, 1922. 
 Երբ պատանի են [When they are Young] Constantinople: H. M. Setian, 1926.
 Մնացորդաց [Remnants], 3 vols., Cairo: Houssaper, 1932-1934.
 Ստեփանոս Սիւնեցի [Stepanos Siunetsi], Paris, 1938.
 Հայ գրականութիւն [Armenian Literature], Jerusalem: St. James Monastery Press, 1942.
 Երբ մեռնիլ գիտենք [When We Know to Die], Jerusalem: St. James Monastery Press, 1944.
 Համապատկեր արեւմտահայ գրականութեան [Panorama of Western Armenian Literature], Jerusalem: St. James Monastery Press (vol. 1-5), Beirut: Hamazkayin (vol. 6), and Antelias: Catholicosate of Cilicia (vol. 7-10), 1945-1982.
 Օրն օրերուն, Խորհուրդ մեր ժամանակներէն [Day of Days: Advice from our Times] Jerusalem: St. James Monastery Press, 1945.
 Սփիւռքը եւ իրաւ բանաստեղծութիւնը (Վահան Թէքէեանի առթիւ) [The Diaspora and True Poetry: On the Occasion of Vahan Tekeyan], Jerusalem: St. James Monastery Press, 1945. 
 Վկայութիւն մը [A Testimony], Aleppo: Ani, 1946.
 Քաղհանք [Harvest], Jerusalem: St. James Monastery Press, 1946.
 Արեւելահայ բանասիրութիւնը եւ Էջմիածին [Eastern Armenian Philology and Ejmiatsin], Antelias: Catholicosate of Cilicia, 1948.
 Խոնարհները [The Humble Ones], Beirut: Ani, 1958.
 Երկեր [Works], Antelias: Catholicosate of Cilicia, 1973.
 Երկեր [Works], Yerevan: Sovetakan Grogh, 1980. 
 Նամականի [Letters], vol. I, Beirut: Altapress, 1983.
 Մայրիներու շուքին տակ [Under the Shade of the Cedars], Beirut: Altapress, 1983.
 Սիւլէյման Էֆէնտի [Suleyman Efendi] Antelias: Catholicosate of Cilicia, 1985.
 Մնացորդաց [Remnants], 3 vols., Antelias: Catholicosate of Cilicia, 1988 (vol. 1 trans.: Remnants: The Way of the Womb, translated by G.M. Goshgarian, London: Gomidas Institute, 2013).
 Երեք թատերախաղեր [Three plays], ed. Vahe Oshagan, San Francisco, 1990.
 Հարիւր մէկ տարուան [One Hundred and One Years], ed. Boghos Snabian, Antelias: Catholicosate of Cilicia, 1997.

References 

Armenian-language writers
1883 births
1948 deaths
Armenians from the Ottoman Empire
People from Bursa Province
Novelists from the Ottoman Empire
19th-century writers from the Ottoman Empire
20th-century writers from the Ottoman Empire
19th-century male writers
20th-century male writers
Armenian expatriates in Bulgaria
Armenian expatriates in Egypt
Armenian expatriates in Mandatory Palestine